Gábor Máthé  (1941) is a Hungarian legal historian, professor, and president of the Hungarian Law Association.

Career 
He studied at Eötvös Loránd University where received his doctorate degree in Law in 1967. He worked as a Scientific Associate of the university at MTA research center between 1967 to 1977.

References

1941 births
20th-century Hungarian lawyers
Place of birth missing (living people)
Living people
21st-century Hungarian lawyers